Märzfeld ('March field' in German) may refer to:

Marchfield (assembly), a Frankish and Lombard institution
one of the Nazi party rally grounds

See also